St. Matthew's College is a private Catholic secondary school, located in Osorno, in the Los Lagos Region of Chile. The school was founded by the Society of the Divine Word in 1932 as the Institute of St. Matthew. The current school is part of the Ignatian Educational Network of Chile and the Latin American Federation of the Society of Jesus (FLACSI).

History

The first school in Osorno, which was named San Mateo and was founded in 1835, is the oldest historical antecedent of the current school that the Sanmateans record. However, the little school had an ephemeral life, because it closed after two years, destroyed by the earthquake of November 1837. A half century later, in 1890, it reopened under the direction of the Fr. Francisco Bohle, but there is no data to confirm that it was in continuity with the original San Mateo.

The missionaries of the Society of the Divine Word took over direction of the school in 1913, when it acquired the name of the German Liceo de Osorno. A fire reduced it to ashes in 1927 and five years later, in 1932, it reopened its doors as the Institute of St. Matthew at the same address on Mackenna Street. In 1958 the German priests of the Divine Word communicated to Bishop Francisco Valdés Subercaseaux that they could not continue running San Mateo. He asked the Jesuits to take charge which they did. In 1959 John Henry, Henry Haske, Joseph O'Neill, Frank Nuggent, James Mc Namara, and Bernard Boyle came from the Maryland Province of the Society of Jesus in the United States.

After the 1960 Valdivia earthquake, John Henry became director and the school was now called St. Matthew College. The Jesuits opened a new building in April 1965 on Barros Arana Street. They also undertook to integrate poorer children from the city and from rural areas, with money received from Maryland. In 1981 the primary school was located at Wenceslao Ramos Street. The three divisions, preschool, primary, and secondary, currently occupy 11 acres and 3 acres respectively.

Though male from its founding, San Mateo began admitting girls in 2005. In 2010 it became a private educational establishment and in 2011 stopped receiving a state subsidy, although it grants scholarships to needy students.

Rectors 
The following individuals have served as rectors of St Matthew's College:

Noyable alumni 

 Álvaro Gómez, actor

See also

 Catholic Church in Chile
 Education in Chile
 List of Jesuit schools

References  

Jesuit secondary schools in Chile
Educational institutions established in 1932
1932 establishments in Chile
Schools in Los Lagos Region